James Prideaux was an Australian rules footballer for . In 1935 Prideaux kicked 95 goals for the season, a record for the club at the time and not bettered by a Port Adelaide player until 1980 by Tim Evans 45 years later.

Then followed this with efforts of 73, 95 and 86, retiring in 1936.

References

Port Adelaide Football Club (SANFL) players
Port Adelaide Football Club players (all competitions)
Australian rules footballers from South Australia